The San Beda College of Medicine (abbreviated as SBCM) is the medical school of the San Beda University in Manila established in 2002.

History 
The San Beda College with the power of autonomy granted by CHED for five years created a consortium with the Loyola Medical College Foundation, Inc. to establish the San Beda College of Medicine. On March 9, 2002, the Board of Trustees of San Beda College approved the establishment of the fifth unit of San Beda, the San Beda College of Medicine. It offered a four-year course leading to the Degree of Doctor of Medicine. The College opened for the school term 2002–2003 at its temporary home on the 5th floor of the Summit One Tower Building, 530 Shaw Boulevard, Mandaluyong to 143 first year medical students. One year later, on June 16, 2003, the College of Medicine transferred to the San Beda College Main Campus at Mendiola Street, Manila. It occupied the St. Benedict’s Hall. By 2005–2006, the College of Medicine had the full complement of year levels with the Clinical clerks (4th year medical students).

Performance in Medical Licensure Examination

Curriculum 
San Beda College of Medicine offers a 4-year MD program designed according to the Commission of Higher Education’s Outcome-Based Medical Education model.

Notable alumni 
Grace Arviola, MD -3rd Place, August 2014 Licensure Examination 
Mary Angeline So, MD -4th Place, February 2013 Licensure Examination

Affiliations

References

External links
 San Beda College Official Website

College of Medicine
Medical schools in the Philippines
Graduate schools in the Philippines